Md. Sharfuddin Ahmed is a Bangladeshi physician and academic. He is the incumbent Vice-Chancellor of Bangabandhu Sheikh Mujib Medical University (BSMMU). He served as Pro Vice Chancellor (Administration) of BSMMU and Secretary General of Bangladesh Medical Association (BMA).

Early life and education
Ahmed was born in Gopalgonj in 1956. He passed S.S.C from Kasiani GC High School in 1972 and H.S.C from Government Rajendra College in 1974. He completed MBBS from Sher-e-Bangla Medical College (SBMC) in 1982.
He obtained Diploma in Ophthalmology (DO) from IPGMR (now, BSMMU) in 1985. He achieved MS in Ophthalmology from Bangabandhu Sheikh Mujib Medical University (BSMMU) in 2004.

Career
Ahmed served as professor and chairman of Community Ophthalmology at  Bangabandhu Sheikh Mujib Medical University (BSMMU). He was appointed as Vice-Chancellor of BSMMU in March 2021.

Professional positions held

 President, Bangladesh Community Ophthalmology Society
 President, Bangladesh Oculoplasty Surgeon's Society
 President, Shadhinota Chikitshok Parishad, Bangabandhu Sheikh Mujib Medical University
 Secretary General, Bangladesh Medical Association
 Secretary General, Ophthalmological Society of Bangladesh
 Vice-president, Bangladesh Academy of Ophthalmology
 Treasurer, Bangladesh Medical Association
 Academic Council Member, Bangabandhu Sheikh Mujib Medical University
 Syndicate Member, Bangabandhu Sheikh Mujib Medical University
 Senate Member, University of Dhaka
 President, Bangladesh Chattra League (student league), Sher-E-Bangla Medical College, Barisal
 Executive Member, Bangladesh National Council for Blind
 Executive Member, Bangladesh Medical Dental Council, etc.

Publications
He has published five books and more than a hundred research articles in national and internationally reputed journals.

Awards and honors

 Mobarak Ali Gold Medal 2020 from OSB
 AIOC Award in Gurugram, 2020
 ISMICS Gold Award 2019 Kolkata, India
 Alim Memorial Gold Medal in 2019 from OSB
 Distinguished Service Award from Dristry Unnyan Sangstha, 2018
 SAARC Academy of Ophthalmology, PVP Award in Nepal, 2018
 Prevention of Blindness Award form APAO Singapore, 2017
 ACOIN-Felicitation Award 2017, Kolkata, India
 Distinguished Service Award form APAO, Bhutan, Korea 2012
 Independence Award by National Teachers Association, 2010, etc.

References 

Bangladeshi physicians
People from Gopalganj District, Bangladesh
1956 births
Bangabandhu Sheikh Mujib Medical University alumni
Bangabandhu Sheikh Mujib Medical University faculty
Living people